Kamaal Dhamaal Malamaal is a 2012 Hindi-language comedy drama film directed by Priyadarshan. It stars Nana Patekar, Paresh Rawal, Om Puri, Asrani, Shreyas Talpade, Shakti Kapoor and Nyra Banerjee. The film has been produced by Percept Picture Company. The story is adapted from Malayalam film Marykkundoru Kunjaadu  written by Benny P. Nayarambalam. It was released on 28 September 2012. This film is the reboot of the 2006 comedy film Malamaal Weekly.

Plot

The insinuating cry of every man, woman and child in this village when they see Johnny Belinda is all about it. Johnny is afraid of everything and everyone. Born into the household of David, a local farmer and being the only son, Johnny does what he's best at to help his ailing father. Nothing, other than buying lottery tickets every week. The only thing going in his life is his love for Maria the daughter of the village's biggest gangster and sworn enemy of David. Peter, armed with three herculean sons, goes to all ends to make sure Maria and Johnny never marry, until one day, hope comes in the form of a silent, strong but always-hungry man, Kallu a.k.a. Sam.

One sudden day, Johnny and his family find Kallu in their well. They get him out and feed him dinner. Next day, Kallu and Johnny go to the market, where Peter's sons were beating Johnny. Kallu saves Johnny and beats the goons in return. A friend of Johnny's asks him if Kallu is his lost brother, Sam. With the question, Johnny gets an idea to have Kallu act as his brother and bodyguard. Johnny convinces Kallu to be his brother Sam and tells him the story of his family history. Johnny introduces Kallu to his family. The family, in long wait of their lost son, accepts Kallu as their lost son, Sam.

Kallu assumes the identity of Sam. With the help of his brother Sam, Johnny starts influencing the entire village. Sam also works hard in the farm and helps the family earn good livelihood. He is well accepted in the family. With the arrival of Sam, good days come to the family. One day, a person tells Johnny's friend that he has seen Kallu in a Kolkata jail, convicted of rape and murder of a woman. Johnny tries to convinces his family that Kallu is not Sam but a rapist and murderer. David, however, says that Sam has already told him the story of his going to jail. Johnny asks Sam to tell one thing which he has not told of Sam as part of his family history. Sam asks for a mango tree which was there. This convinces the family that Kallu is actually Sam. They in turn throw away Johnny out of home.

Johnny takes a job at the local church and starts living as the neighbor of his father's house. He keeps looking for an opportunity to kill Sam, but all in vain. On the eve of Christmas, Sam sets the house on fire. Everyone thinks Johnny has done the same and blame him. Johnny, disappointed with himself, writes a suicide note sitting in his hut. At that time, he sees Sam and another man enter into burnt hut. He follows them and finds that Sam and the man have dug into the house. They take out the stolen golden cross of the village church. Johnny is seen by Sam and the other man. Sam tells johnny that he had stolen it long back, hidden it under the mango tree and run away. Later in the meantime, as he came out of jail, the tree was cut and the house was built. So to get this, he had set the house on fire. In the meantime, the other man runs away with the cross. Johnny and Sam catch him in the field. The other man confesses that he was the one who had raped and murdered the lady and told the police that Sam had done it. Sam beats the man to death. Sam injures Johnny who was trying to take the cross back to the church, but falls again into the well. Johnny, feeling grateful for Sam's earlier help, rescues him. Sam is walking with the cross when Johnny reminds him of the love Sam received from his family. Hearing this, Sam leaves the cross there only. Johnny brings the cross to Church, but people accuse him of theft. Johnny is unable to prove his innocence. Suddenly, Sam appears and displays the thief's body. The village accepts this. As decided, if Johnny gets the golden cross for Church, he marries Maria. Johnny tells Sam now he is a permanent member of the family.

Cast
 Nana Patekar as Kallu / Sam
 Paresh Rawal as Peter
 Om Puri as David
 Asrani as Father
 Shreyas Talpade as Johny / Bakri
 Shakti Kapoor as Pascal
 Razzak Khan as Paedro
 Anjana Sukhani as item number "Desi Mem"
 Sona Nair as Maria
 Pratima Kannan as Bulbul Auntie
 Tarina Patel as Lily
 Nyra Banerjee as Maria
 Neeraj Vora as Pintoo
 Rajeev Pillai as Gogo

Production
The film is being and produced by Percept Picture Company.

Controversy 
Catholic organisations in India have protested the film as blasphemous and offensive. The Goan Catholic Welfare Union threatened to disallow the screening in their state. Shailendra Singh of Percept Picture Company has said the film is in fact clean and that he respects the sentiments of Catholics.

Soundtrack

The soundtrack was composed by Sajid Wajid, with lyrics penned by Jalees Sherwani. The album consists of six songs. The audio rights of the film were acquired by T-Series. The album was launched on 13 September 2012 at Mumbai.

References

External links
 Official website

Films directed by Priyadarshan
Indian comedy-drama films
Films scored by Sajid–Wajid
Films scored by Ouseppachan
Films about Christianity
2012 comedy-drama films
2012 films
Hindi remakes of Malayalam films